Sassofeltrio is a comune (municipality) in the Province of Rimini in the Italian region Emilia-Romagna, located about  southeast of Bologna and about  south of Rimini.

Sassofeltrio borders the following municipalities: Chiesanuova (San Marino), Faetano (San Marino), Fiorentino (San Marino), Gemmano, Mercatino Conca, Montegiardino (San Marino), Monte Grimano, Montescudo, San Leo, Verucchio.

Twin towns
 Caderzone Terme, Italy

References